Atriplex phyllostegia is a species of saltbush known by the common names arrowscale, leafcover saltweed, and Truckee orach. It is native to the western United States from California to Utah, where it grows in meadow bottoms and areas with saline soils such as dry or ephemeral lakes.

Description
This is an annual herb with a mainly erect branching green stem growing up to 40 centimeters tall. The distinctive leaves are fleshy and diamond or arrowhead-shaped and 1 to 4 centimeters long. The plant is generally monoecious, although some individuals bear only female flowers.

Male and female flowers appear in the leaf axils, and the male flowers are sometimes borne in spikelike inflorescences. The female flower clusters are enclosed in bracteoles which may be up to 2 centimeters long and resemble the leaves.

External links
Jepson Manual Treatment
USDA Plants Profile
Flora of North America
Photo gallery

phyllostegia
Flora of California
Flora of Nevada
Flora of Utah
Flora of the California desert regions
Flora of the Great Basin
Flora of the Sonoran Deserts
Natural history of the Central Valley (California)
Natural history of the Mojave Desert
Plants described in 1871
Flora without expected TNC conservation status